Law & Order: Organized Crime is an American crime drama television series that premiered on April 1, 2021, on NBC. The seventh series in the Law & Order franchise and a spin-off of Law & Order and  Law & Order: Special Victims Unit, the series stars Christopher Meloni as Elliot Stabler, reprising his role from SVU.

Overview

Episodes

Season 1 (2021)

Season 2 (2021−22)

Season 3 (2022−23)
</onlyinclude>

Ratings

Season 1

Season 2

Season 3

Notes

References

External links
  on Wolf Entertainment
  on NBC
 

2021 American television series debuts
2020s American crime drama television series
2020s American police procedural television series
American television spin-offs
Fictional portrayals of the New York City Police Department
Law & Order (franchise)
Law & Order: Special Victims Unit
NBC original programming
Television productions suspended due to the COVID-19 pandemic
Television series about organized crime
Television series about widowhood
Television series created by Dick Wolf
Television series by Universal Television
Television shows filmed in New York City
Television shows set in Manhattan
Works about the American Mafia